Mary Hazelton Blanchard Wade (March 23, 1860 – 1936) was an American writer.

Born Mary Hazelton Blanchard in Charlestown, Massachusetts, daughter of Charles Hentry and Caroline Cecilia Blanchard, she was educated at a high school in Malden and then received further education by private tutors. In 1877 she began working as a teacher. On November 14, 1882, she was married to Louis Francis Wade. Mary became a prolific author, particularly of children's fiction.

Bibliography

 Anahei: our little brown cousin (1901)
 Our little Indian cousin (1901)
 Little Japanese cousin (1901)
 Petrovna our little Russian cousin (1901)
 Little Eskimo cousin (1902)
 Mpuke: our little African cousin (1902)
 Alila, Our Little Philippine cousin (1902)
 Little Hawaiian cousin (1902)
 Our Little Cuban cousin (1902)
 Our Little Porto Rican cousin (1902)
 Our little Italian cousin (1903)
 Our little Swiss cousin (1903)
 The little Japanese girl (1903)
 Mari, Our little Norwegian cousin (1903)
 Our Little Siamese Cousin (1903)
 Our little Irish cousin (1904)
 Our little German cousin (1904)
 Our little Turkish cousin (1904)
 Our little Canadian cousin (1904
 Ten little Indians: stories of how indian children lived and played (1904)
 The little Norwegian girl (1904)
 Wah Sing, our little Chinese cousin (1904)
 Our little Jewish cousin (1904)    
 Artin: our little Armenian cousin (1905)
 The coming of the white men; stories of how our country was discovered (1905)
 Ten big Indians: stories of famous Indian chiefs (1905)
 Indian fairy tales as told to the little children of the wigwam (1906)
 Old colony days : stories of the first settlers and how our country grew (1906)
 Our little Philippine cousin (1906)
 Our Little Russian Cousin (1906)
 Building the nation; stories of how our forefathers lived and what they did to make our country a united one (1907)
 Ten Indian hunters: stories of famous Indian hunters (1907)
 Our little Japanese cousin (1908)
 Carl: our little Swiss cousin (1909)
 Chin: our little Siamese cousin (1909)
 Little folks of North America; stories about children living in the different parts of North America (1909)
 Tessa: our little Italian cousin (1909)
 Etu, our little Eskimo cousin (1910)
 Lotus Blossom: our little Japanese cousin (1910)
 George Washington: a story and a play (1911)
 Abraham Lincoln: a story and a play (1914)
 Benjamin Franklin: a story and a play (1914)
 Ulysses Simpson Grant: a story and a play (1914)
 Pilgrims of to-day (1916)
 Swift fawn: the little foundling (1916)
 Timid hare: the little captive (1916)
 Our little Swiss cousin (1917)
 Twin travelers in South America (1918)
 The light-bringers (1919)
 Twin travelers in the holy land (1919)
 Our little Irish cousin (1920)
 Twin travelers in India (1920)
 Twin travelers in China and Japan (1922)
 The wonder workers (1922)
 Real Americans (1923)
 The master builders (1925)
 Swift fawn (1925)
 Adventurers all (1927)
 Leaders to liberty (1927)
 The boy who found out: the story of Henri Fabre (1928)
 The boy who dared: the story of William Penn (1929)
 The new pioneers (1934)

References

External links

 
 
 
 

1860 births
1936 deaths
Writers from Massachusetts
American children's writers
American educators
People from Charlestown, Boston